The Continental Cup is a second-level ice hockey tournament for European clubs (behind Champions Hockey League), begun in 1997 after the discontinuing of the European Cup. It was intended for teams from countries without representatives in the European Hockey League, with participating teams chosen by the countries' respective ice hockey associations. Hans Dobida served as chairman of the Continental Cup until 2018.

Format
The competition began in 1997–98 with 42 clubs from 26 countries, which expanded to 48 teams for the next two years. The tournament was played in seeded rounds of qualifying groups. There were three rounds of qualifying groups, with winners of qualifying groups progressing to the next round. The three winners of the third round groups entered the semifinals, along with the host club. The first round was held in September, the second in October, the third in November and the finals in December.

In the 2000–01 season, with the European Hockey League on hiatus, the Continental Cup became the de facto European club championship. The format remained the same, with 36 teams from 27 countries.

With the beginning of the IIHF European Champions Cup from 2004 to 2005, participants included national champions of countries not in the Super Six (the top six European nations according to the IIHF World Ranking), as well as teams from Super Six leagues, which included HC Dynamo Moscow and HKm Zvolen.

Winners

Medals (1997-2023)

IIHF Federation Cup

The Federation Cup was an official European ice hockey club competition created in 1995. It was the second European competition for club teams, intended for those teams who could not qualify for the European Cup, especially for those from Eastern European countries.  It was the direct predecessor of the IIHF Continental Cup, which was played two seasons later.

Format
In the first year of competition, 13 Eastern European teams from twelve countries participated in the tournament. In a KO-system with three qualifying groups, which qualifies the four participants in the finals. The following year was played in the same mode. Due to the increased number of participants (some Western European clubs had registered for the competition), an additional qualifying round was introduced.

Federation Cup winners

See also
 IIHF European Cup
 Champions Hockey League
 IIHF Super Cup
 European Cup

References

External links
 Continental Cup at Eurohockey.com

 
International Ice Hockey Federation tournaments
Ice hockey tournaments in Europe
Multi-national professional sports leagues